Michael Kennedy (1911 – 14 May 1977) was an Irish hurler who played as a full-back for the Limerick senior team.

Kennedy joined the team during the 1933 championship and was a regular member of the starting fifteen until his retirement almost a decade later. During that time he won three All-Ireland medals, four Munster medals and five National Hurling League medals. Kennedy was an All-Ireland runner-up on one occasion.

At club level Kennedy played with Young Irelands.

References

1911 births
1977 deaths
Drom-Inch hurlers
Young Irelands (Limerick) hurlers
Tipperary hurlers
Limerick inter-county hurlers
Munster inter-provincial hurlers
All-Ireland Senior Hurling Championship winners